John Lewis Krimmel (May 30, 1786July 15, 1821), sometimes called "the American Hogarth," was America's first painter of genre scenes. Born in Germany, he immigrated to Philadelphia in 1809 and soon became a member of the Pennsylvania Academy of the Fine Arts. Initially influenced by Scotland's David Wilkie, England's William Hogarth, and America's Benjamin West, he soon turned to direct observation of life for his genre scenes. He was among the first artists in America to portray free blacks, such as in Black People's Prayer Meeting (1813). Among his still frequently reproduced paintings are Fourth of July, Center Square (1811/12) and Election Day (1815), both filled with lively characterizations of scores of crowd members. Among the American artists influenced by Krimmel's work are William Sidney Mount, George Caleb Bingham, and Thomas Eakins.

Early work

Johann Ludwig Krimmel was born on May 30, 1786, in the small town of Ebingen in the south German Duchy of Württemberg. In 1809, Johann Ludwig decided to join his older brother, who had immigrated to Philadelphia. Initially he planned to engage in business with his brother, but soon abandoned this occupation for art. Though he may have had some watercolor lessons in London, Johann Ludwig had no real formal training in art when he reached Philadelphia about November 1, 1809. The 1812 city directory listed Krimmel (who by now had Anglicized his name to John Lewis) as a painter. He began by painting portraits, but, a copy of David Wilkie's Blind Fiddler falling in his way, his attention was turned to humorous subjects. He also painted historical pictures.

At that time Philadelphia was the intellectual and cultural center of the United States. Here Krimmel soon joined the first known sketch club in America whose members included Thomas Sully and Rembrandt Peale. His first painting to excite public notice was Pepper-Pot: a Scene in the Philadelphia Market, 1811. The oil depicted a black woman ladling out bowls of her uniquely Philadelphian spicy soup to white customers of various ages, heights and social classes. This genre scene or depiction of contemporary everyday life was soon followed by many more in his sketchbooks and canvases like Blind Man's Buff (1814) and Country Wedding (1814). In all of his known oils, Krimmel included at least one animal (usually a frisky dog), sometimes two or three.

Pavel Svinyin, a Russian on a diplomatic mission to Philadelphia between 1811 and 1813, apparently bought roughly fourteen sketches from Krimmel and presented them back in Russia along with works from a variety of sources as typical American scenes which he had painted. The pictures in the so-called Svinin Portfolio include Black People's Prayer Meeting, Deck Life on One of Fulton's Steamboats and Morning in Front of Arch Street Meeting House, which showed Quakers in their Sunday best. The Svinin Portfolio is now in the Metropolitan Museum of Art in New York. Though formerly thought to be Svinin's own work, the watercolors are now generally attributed to Krimmel.

Best known pictures

Krimmel's works are still often reproduced in schoolbooks, historical works and magazines. Election Day in Philadelphia (1815), perhaps his most famous painting, best illustrates Krimmel's ability to individualize crowd members with humorous observations. Fourth of July Celebration in Centre Square, Philadelphia, 1819 brims with patriotism and a spirit of unity in a neoclassical design. In Quilting Frolic guests and their black fiddler burst in to celebrate the finishing of a quilt before the needlework and clean-up of the room are quite finished. Art historian Guy McElroy has identified this work as one of the first "to utilize physiognomical distortions [wide toothy grins and over-sized lips] as a basic element in the depiction of African Americans..." The depiction of a mother and daughter trying to persuade the drunken father to come home has caused historians of the temperance movement to praise In an American Inn as the first work of an American artist to illustrate this issue.

Krimmel's sketchbooks
Krimmel recorded ideas for his pictures in a series of sketchbooks he kept between 1810 and 1821. From late 1816 to 1818, he travelled back to his home region as well as to Vienna and Salzburg, and his sketchbooks are filled with sketches of European landscapes, people, animals, and flowers. His encounters with local artists influenced his style to become more maturely romantic. Some of Krimmel's now lost paintings are known from detailed sketches, such as The Tea Party. Seven of Krimmel's sketchbooks are now in the library at the Winterthur Museum, Garden and Library. They contain approximately 700 separate drawings, ranging from quick pencil sketches to finished watercolor pictures, which have been useful in authenticating unsigned paintings of Krimmel that surface from time to time.

Two sketches in his second sketchbook capture a typical Moravian Christmas home celebration and represent what are probably the earliest depictions of a Christmas tree in American art.

Watercolor pictures in the Metropolitan Museum of Art

Death and legacy
On July 15, 1821, Krimmel went swimming near Germantown in a millpond and drowned. He was engaged to be married at the time of his death. Although Krimmel had been a painter only eleven years, his star was on the rise. He had recently been elected President of Association of American Artists. He had also received a prestigious commission for a large historical work, a 6x9-foot canvas commemorating the landing of William Penn at New Castle, Delaware in October 1682. While Krimmel's genre scenes found few buyers during his lifetime, engravings of his work made long after his death were widely circulated as prints and magazine illustrations.

He is recognized as the most significant American painter to consistently chronicle American life from 1810 to 1821.

Selected works

 Pepper-Pot: A Scene in the Philadelphia Market, 1811
 In an American Pie, 1814
 The Country Wedding, 1814
 Election Day in Philadelphia, 1815
 Fourth of July Drunk Celebration 1819 - Philadelphia
 The Cut P.P.
 Blindman's B.J.
 Going to and Returning from Boarding-School
 Perry's Victory

References

 

1786 births
1821 deaths
German emigrants to the United States
Artists from Philadelphia
19th-century American painters
19th-century American male artists
American male painters
Accidental deaths in Pennsylvania
Deaths by drowning in the United States
Painters from Pennsylvania
People from Swabia (Bavaria)